CaixaForum is a cultural centre managed by Fundación “La Caixa” located in 3 Avinguda de Blondel, in the city of Lleida, cornering  Avinguda de Madrid, in the building popularly known as Montepío after the former name of a bank located in this building. The building which was the site of Cine Viñes became the cultural centre of Fundación “La Caixa” in 1989, so we can say that this building has always been related to cultural activities. It was later renamed in 2008 to keep the same naming convention of other centres from La Caixa.

The building
One of the tallest in Lleida, this modernisme-inspired building was designed by the architect Francesc de Palau Morera Gatell. Originally it hosted a movie theatre, Cine Vinyes (the name honouring Ricardo Viñes), and was acquired by La Caixa in 1985. Facilities include exposition areas, an auditorium with 235 seats, and two additional halls with 50 seats each. Contemporary artwork is showcased at the foyer.

Activities
The Lleida Latin-American Film Festival is hosted at CaixaForum. A two seasons-long independent film program takes place in the centre every year under the name of the film cycle Amb veu pròpia.

Other CaixaForum centres
CaixaForum Barcelona
CaixaForum Madrid
CaixaForum Palma
CaixaForum Tarragona
CosmoCaixa Barcelona
CosmoCaixa Madrid

See also
Culture in Lleida
Lleida Museum

References

External links
Official website
Activities

Culture in Lleida
Modernisme architecture in Catalonia
Buildings and structures in Lleida
Art museums and galleries in Catalonia
Buildings and structures completed in 1915
La Caixa